DWRB (549 AM) Radyo Pilipinas is a radio station owned and operated by the Philippine Broadcasting Service. Its studio and transmitter are located at City Youth Center, Taal Ave., Brgy Dayangdang, Naga, Camarines Sur. During sign off hours, signal from CNR 5 549 or DZXL 558 can be heard.

References

Campus Radio Naga
Radio stations established in 1987
Philippine Broadcasting Service
News and talk radio stations in the Philippines